Elections to Portsmouth City Council were held on 7 May 1998.  One third of the council was up for election and the Labour party stayed in overall control of the council.

After the election, the composition of the council was
Labour 21
Liberal Democrat 10
Conservative 8

Election result

References
"Council poll results", The Guardian 9 May 1998 page 16

1998
1998 English local elections
1990s in Hampshire